The Lady Lies may refer to:

The Lady Lies (film), a 1929 film, starring Walter Huston
The Lady Lies (song), a 1978 song by Genesis